The Canadian Authors Association  is Canada's oldest association for writers and authors. The organization has published several periodicals, organized local chapters and events for Canadian writers, and sponsors writing awards, including the Governor General's Awards.

History
The Canadian Authors Association was founded in 1921. The founding organizers included John Murray Gibbon, Bernard Keble Sandwell, Stephen Leacock, and Pelham Edgar. By the end of its first year the organization had more than 700 members.

In its early years the association was known for its conservative views on literature and its support of traditional writing genres, including colourful idealized stories in quaint local settings. Local chapters of the CAA organized activities to encourage and develop the skills of Canadian writers, including study groups, readings, and workshops.

In 1919, the CAA founded a magazine, Canadian Bookman. In 1936, the association founded Canadian Poetry, edited by E. J. Pratt.

The association founded the Governor General's Awards in 1937, Canada's highest literary award, as well as the Canadian Authors Association Awards.

Notable presidents
 Will R. Bird (c. 1949–1950), writer, author, recipient of Ryerson Fiction Award
 W. G. Hardy (1950–1952), Professor of Classics at University of Alberta, president of the International Ice Hockey Federation, Member of the Order of Canada

Awards
The Canadian Authors Awards, originally known as Canadian Authors Association or CAA Awards and now occasionally called Literary Awards, were created in 1975 to fill in for the Governor General’s medals, as these were overtaken by the Canada Council for the Arts, and were presented in multiple categories to authors who are Canadian born or permanent residents. The following is an incomplete list of winners of the award, originally given out in three categories (fiction, poetry and drama), before the category Canadian History and the Emerging Writer Award were added in 1997 and 2006. After 2017 all categories were discontinued and replaced by the Canadian Authors Fred Kerner Award, which had already been accoladed the first time in 2016.
CAA Award for Fiction (1975–2017)
 1975 Fred Stenson for Lonesome Hero
 1976 none
 1977 Carol Shields for Small Ceremonies
 1978 Jane Rule for The Young in One Another's Arms
 1979 Marian Engel for The Glassy Sea
 1980 none
 1981 Hugh MacLennan for Voices in Time
 1982 Joy Kogawa for Obasan
 1983 W.P. Kinsella for Shoeless Joe
 1984 Heather Robertson for Willie: A Romance: Volume 1 of the King Years
 1985 Timothy Findley for Not Wanted on the Voyage
 1986 Robertson Davies for What's Bred in the Bone (Cornish Trilogy, #2)
 1987 none
 1988 Brian Moore for The Colour of Blood
 1989 Joan Clark for The Victory Of Geraldine Gull
 1990 James Houston for Running West
 1991 David Adams Richards for Evening Snow Will Bring Such Peace
 1992 Alberto Manguel for News From A Foreign Country Came
 1993 Neil Bissoondath for Innocence Of Age
 1994 Margaret Atwood for The Robber Bride
 1995 Bernice Morgan for Waiting for Time (Random Passage, #2)
 1996 L.R. Wright for Mother Love (Karl Alberg #7)
 1997 Ann-Marie MacDonald for Fall on Your Knees
 1998 Rita Donovan for Landed
 1999 Wayne Johnston for The Colony of Unrequited Dreams
 2000 Alistair MacLeod for No Great Mischief
 2001 Elizabeth Hay for A Student of Weather
 2002 Will Ferguson for Happiness
 2003 Rohinton Mistry for Family Matters
 2004 Douglas Coupland for Hey Nostradamus!
 2005 Jeffrey Moore for The Memory Artists
 2006 Joseph Boyden for Three Day Road
 2007 Richard Wagamese for Dream Wheels
 2008 Paulette Jiles for Stormy Weather
 2009 Nino Ricci for The Origin of Species
 2010 Michael Crummey for Galore
 2011 Tom Rachman for The Imperfectionists
 2012 Patrick deWitt for The Sisters Brothers
 2013 Christopher Meades for The Last Hiccup
 2014 Joseph Boyden for The Orenda
 2015 Miriam Toews for All My Puny Sorrows 
 2016 Nino Ricci for Sleep
 2017 Alissa York for The Naturalist
CAA Award for Poetry (1975–2017)
 1975 Tom Wayman for For and Against the Moon
 1976 Jim Green for North Book
 1977 Sid Stephen for Beothuck Poems
 1978 Alden Nowlan forSmoked Glass
 1979 Andrew Suknaski for The Ghosts You Call Poor
 1980 Michael Ondaatje for There's a Trick with a Knife I’m Learning to Do: Poems, 1963–1978
 1981 Leona Gom for Land of The Peace
 1982 Gary Geddes for the acid test
 1983 George Amabile for the presence of fire
 1984 Don McKay for Birding or Desire
 1985 Leonard Cohen for Book of Mercy
 1986 P.K. Page for The Glass Air
 1987 Al Purdy for The Collected Poems 1956–1986
 1988 Pat Lane for Selected Poems
 1989 Bruce Rice for Daniel
 1990 Don Bailey for Homeless Heart
 1991 Richard Lemm for Prelude to the Bacchanal
 1992 Anne Michaels for Miner's Pond
 1993 Lorna Crozier for Inventing the Hawk
 1994 George Bowering for George Bowering Selected Poems
 1995 Tim Lilburn for Moosehead Sandhills
 1996 Di Brandt for Jerusalem, beloved
 1997 E.D. Blodgett for Apostrophes: woman at a piano
 1998 Anne Szumigalski for On Glassy Wings
 1999 Janice Kulyk Keefer for Marrying the Sea
 2000 Helen Humphreys for Anthem
 2001 Carmine Starnino for Credo
 2002 Tim Bowling for Darkness and Silence
 2003 Margaret Avison for Concrete and Wild Carrot
 2004 Chris Banks for Bonfires
 2005 Peter Trower for Haunted Hills and Hanging Valleys
 2006 Barry Dempster for The Burning Alphabet
 2007 Sarah Klassen for A Curious Beatitude
 2008 Asa Boxer for The Mechanical Bird
 2009 Elise Partridge for Chameleon Hours
 2010 Tom Dawe for Where Genesis Begins
 2011 Julia McCarthy for Return from Erebus
 2012 Goran Simić for Sunrise in the Eyes of the Snowman
 2013 Don McKay for Paradoxides
 2014 Renee Sarojini Saklikar for children of air india
 2015 Tim Bowling for Circa Nineteen Hundred and Grief 
 2016 Joe Denham for Regeneration Machine
 2017 Johanna Skibsrud for The Description of the World 
CAA Award for Canadian History (1997–2017)
1997 Phil Jenkins for An Acre of Time
1998 Dorothy Harley Eber for Images of Justice
1999 Rod McQueen for The Eatons
2000 D’Arcy Jenish for Indian Fall (The Last Great Days of the Plains Cree and the Blackfoot Confederacy)
2001 Will Ferguson for Canadian History for Dummies
2002 Ken McGoogan for Fatal Passage: The Untold Story of John Rae, the Arctic Adventurer Who Discovered the Fate of Franklin
2003  Derek Hayes for Historical Atlas of Canada
2004 Ishmael Alunik, Eddie D. Kolausok and David Morrison for Across Time and Tundra: The Inuvialuit of the Western Arctic
2005  Charlotte Gray for The Museum Called Canada
2006 J.L. Granatstein for The Last Good War
2007 Mark Zuehlke for For Honour's Sake: the War of 1812 and the Brokering of an Uneasy Peace
2008  Robert Wright for Three Nights in Havana
2009 J.M. Bumsted for Lord Selkirk: A Life
2010  Jonathan F. Vance for A History of Canadian Culture
 2011 Shelagh D. Grant for Polar Imperative: A History of Arctic Sovereignty in North America
 2012 Richard Gwyn for Nation Maker: Sir John A. MacDonald: His Life, Our Times, Volume Two: 1867–1891
 2013 Michael S. Cross for A Biography of Robert Baldwin: The Morning-Star of Memory
 2014 Charlotte Gray for The Massey Murder: A Maid, Her Master and the Trial that Shocked a Nation
 2015 Robert Wright for The Night Canada Stood Still 
 2016 Debra Komer for The Bastard of Fort Stikine: The Hudson's Bay Company and the Murder of John McLoughlin Jr.
 2017 Charlotte Gray for The Promise of Canada 
CAA Emerging Writer Award (2006–2017)
 2011 Titilope Sonuga for Down to Earth
 2012 Ryan Flavelle for The Patrol: Seven Days in the Life of a Canadian Soldier in Afghanistan
 2013 Tie: Claire Battershill for several fiction, poetry and review works and Jay Bahadur for journalistic work and The Pirates of Somalia
 2014 Grace O'Connell for Magnified World
 2015 Kim Fu for For Today I Am a Boy
 2016 Kayla Czaga for For Your Safety Please Hold On
 2017 Eva Crocker for several anthology stories
CAA Award for Drama (1975–prior 2017)
 1985 Ken Mitchell for Gone The Burning Sun
 1992 Drew Hayden Taylor for The Bootlegger Blues: A Play
 1993 Guy Vanderhaeghe for I Had A Job I Liked. Once: A Play
Canadian Authors Fred Kerner Award
 2016 Caroline Vu for Palawan Story
 2017 Margo Wheaton for The Unlit Path Behind the House
 2018 Ahmad Danny Ramadan for The Clothesline Swing
 2019 Maureen Medved for Black Star
 2020 Adrienne Drobnies for Salt and Ashes
 2021 Joanna Lilley for Endlings
 2022 Catherine Graham for Æther: An Out-of-Body Lyric

References

1921 establishments in Canada
Governor General's Awards
Canadian writers' organizations